Inès Boutaleb (born 8 November 1998) is a footballer who plays as a forward for the Algeria women's national football team. She competed for Algeria at the 2018 Africa Women Cup of Nations, playing in three matches.

References

External links
 
 

1998 births
Living people
Algerian women's footballers
Algeria women's international footballers
Women's association football forwards
French women's footballers
Olympique Lyonnais Féminin players
Division 1 Féminine players
People from Vénissieux
French sportspeople of Algerian descent
Grenoble Foot 38 (women) players
Sportspeople from Lyon Metropolis
Footballers from Auvergne-Rhône-Alpes
France women's youth international footballers